Jamie Saint John Bamber Griffith (born 3 April 1973), known professionally as Jamie Bamber, is a British actor, known for his roles as Lee Adama in Battlestar Galactica and Detective Sergeant Matt Devlin in the ITV series Law & Order: UK. He also had a supporting role as 2nd Lt. Jack Foley in the HBO miniseries Band of Brothers, as Lieutenant Archie Kennedy in the Hornblower series and was a regular on the British series Ultimate Force and Peak Practice. In 2013, Bamber starred in the TNT medical drama Monday Mornings, and in 2014, in the Sky 1 drama The Smoke.

Early life
Bamber was born on 3 April 1973 in Hammersmith, London, England, to Ralph and Elizabeth Griffith. His father is from the United States and his mother is from Northern Ireland. At the time Bamber was born, his father was an American management consultant. Bamber has five brothers and one sister, actress Anastasia Griffith.

Bamber was educated at St Paul's School in London, and graduated with a first in Modern Languages (Italian and French) from St John's College, Cambridge, before attending and graduating from the London Academy of Music and Dramatic Art. He is fluent in both Italian and French, having spent part of his childhood in Paris. Bamber appeared in the 1994 student film Shifting Sands.

Acting career

Battlestar Galactica
Beginning in 2003, Bamber starred as Lee 'Apollo' Adama in the re-imagined Battlestar Galactica that started as a miniseries and served as a backdoor pilot for the 2004 television series on the US Sci Fi Channel (now Syfy). The show received critical acclaim and received a Peabody Award plus a number of nominations in its four-season run; Bamber was nominated for a Saturn Award for Best Supporting Actor on Television for Battlestar Galactica in 2004.

In the role of Lee Adama, Londoner Bamber speaks with an American accent which is frequently cited for its accuracy; he credits being exposed to his father's American accent from childhood.  He also darkened his hair, in an effort to more closely resemble Edward James Olmos, who plays his character's father. Reciprocally, Olmos wore contact lenses with blue irises to match Bamber's eyes.

Bamber wrote the foreword for Titan Books' Battlestar Galactica: The Official Companion Season Three by David Bassom. Of the show's dramatic resonance, he said:

... that's what good drama lets us do. It allows us to see and to feel things we otherwise would not. And great drama allows us to do that on every level: the psychological, the personal and the political. I am proud to say that in the pared down world of Battlestar Galactica there is no plot, no character and no relationship that does not breathe the oxygen of all three levels at once.

Other television roles

Bamber is also well known for his role as DS Matt Devlin, the impulsive younger partner of veteran detective DS Ronnie Brooks (Bradley Walsh) on Law & Order: UK for the show's first five series, from 2009 to 2011.

He played Lieutenant Archibald "Archie" Kennedy in the popular ITV series Hornblower, appearing in five of the eight television films in which Kennedy (rising in ranks from midshipman to lieutenant) has a much expanded role from that essayed in C.S. Forester's novels. Bamber also appeared as a trainee doctor in the final series of long running ITV soap Peak Practice, and portrayed an SAS officer in Ultimate Force; it was on a break from the latter, which he subsequently revealed as a job that he was not entirely happy with, that he traveled to Los Angeles and read for Battlestar Galactica.

Bamber guest starred in the second season premiere of Joss Whedon's Dollhouse where his character is wed to Echo (played by Eliza Dushku) during one of her missions; he also reunited with his Battlestar Galactica co-star Tahmoh Penikett in the episode. In the BBC's Outcasts, Bamber portrayed a hot-tempered expeditionary leader amongst colonists of a distant planet in the late 21st century; though he had been offered a larger part in the series, he elected to take the supporting role in part because he was wary of following up Battlestar Galactica with another sci-fi series that bore a few similarities. Other TV series in which he has made guest appearances include CSI: Miami, NCIS, House, Cold Case, Ghost Whisperer, The Last Detective, Body of Proof, Perception, Rizzoli & Isles and the HBO miniseries Band of Brothers.

He played the role of detective Caolán Longstreet in 17th Precinct, a pilot by Galactica creator Ronald D. Moore described as a police drama which takes place in a world governed by magic. The pilot was not picked up by NBC for the fall 2011 season; it would have also re-united him with his Galactica co-stars James Callis and Tricia Helfer.

Bamber starred as neurosurgeon Dr. Tyler Wilson in Monday Mornings, the David E. Kelley-produced series for TNT, co-executive-produced by Sanjay Gupta and based on his novel of the same name. The series debuted in February 2013; it was cancelled after one season. In 2014 he played the lead role of Kev Allison, a London firefighter struggling to keep his personal and professional relationships together after a life-altering accident on the job, in The Smoke, a Kudos Television drama for Sky1 in the UK.

He currently has supporting roles in two UK series: Marcella, returning for a second series in 2018; and Fearless. He also plays a recurring role in the 2018 STARZ series Counterpart and starred as Colonel Alexander Coltrane in the Cinemax series Strike Back.   He plays Archie Hughes, Martha's business partner and ex-fiance, in the BBC TV series  Beyond Paradise, which started airing in 2023.

Film
Bamber played the starring role in the 2008 film Pulse 2: Afterlife, a direct-to-DVD sequel to 2006's Pulse. Earlier he starred in The Devil's Tattoo (known as Ghost Rig in the US) along with Kerry Norton, who was later to become his wife.

He made his French-language acting debut in 2012 in Martin Valente's , portraying the American fiancé of the female lead played by French pop star . According to Bamber, his character is loosely based on Andre Agassi.

In May 2011, Bamber completed filming John Doe: Vigilante, an Australian production directed by Kelly Dolen. The film was released in the United States on 21 March 2014.

On 9 June 2015, Variety announced that Jamie Bamber, Kellan Lutz, Jesse Williams, and Jess Weixler had joined the cast of a thriller film titled Money, directed by Martin Rosete and produced by Atit Shah.

Stage and radio
Bamber's stage appearances include Prince Hal in Henry IV Parts 1 and 2 at the Bristol Old Vic in 2002; and in 2005 he appeared as Mephistopheles in Dr. Faustus; at the Liverpool Playhouse.

He has also acted in radio serials; major roles include Sebastian Flyte in Brideshead Revisited and Philip in Where Angels Fear to Tread for BBC Radio 4.

Personal life
Bamber is married to English actress and singer Kerry Norton who played Ishay, Doc Cottle's assistant, on Battlestar Galactica. The couple have three daughters.

Filmography

Film

Television

Web

Video games

References

External links

 
 

Living people
1973 births
20th-century English male actors
21st-century English male actors
Alumni of St John's College, Cambridge
Alumni of the London Academy of Music and Dramatic Art
English male film actors
English male radio actors
English male television actors
English people of American descent
English people of Northern Ireland descent
British expatriates in the United States
Male actors from London
People educated at St Paul's School, London
People from Hammersmith
English male stage actors
English male Shakespearean actors